Struthiolaria, commonly known as the ostrich foot snails, is a genus of sea snails, marine gastropod molluscs in the family Struthiolariidae.

Species
Species within the genus Struthiolaria include:
 Struthiolaria ameghinoi Ihering, 1897 
 Struthiolaria frazeri Hutton, 1917 
  † Struthiolaria incrassata Powell, 1931
 Struthiolaria papulosa (Martyn, 1784)
 Struthiolaria papulosa gigas Sowerby, G.B. II, 1842
 † Struthiolaria (Callusaria) arthritica Bartrum & Powell, 1928
 † Struthiolaria (Callusaria) callosa Marwick, 1924
 † Struthiolaria (Callusaria) obesa Hutton, 1885
 † Struthiolaria (Callusaria) otaioica Laws, 1935
 † Struthiolaria (Callusaria) spinifera Marwick, 1924
 † Struthiolaria (Callusaria) spinosa Hector, 1886
 †  Struthiolaria (Callusaria) tuberculata Hutton, 1873
 † Struthiolaria (Struthiolaria) calcar Hutton, 1886
 † Struthiolaria (Struthiolaria) cincta Hutton, 1873
 † Struthiolaria (Struthiolaria) cingulata Zittel, 1864
 † Struthiolaria (Struthiolaria) dolorosa L. C. King, 1934
 † Struthiolaria (Struthiolaria) errata Marwick, 1924
 † Struthiolaria (Struthiolaria) firthi Marwick, 1948
 † Struthiolaria (Struthiolaria) frazeri Hutton, 1885
 † Struthiolaria (Struthiolaria) illepida Bartrum & Powell, 1928
 † Struthiolaria (Struthiolaria) lawsi Powell & Bartrum, 1929
 † Struthiolaria (Struthiolaria) nexa Marwick, 1931
 † Struthiolaria (Struthiolaria) praenuntia Marwick, 1926
 † Struthiolaria (Struthiolaria) prior Finlay, 1926

Species brought into synonymy 
 † Struthiolaria acuminata Marwick, 1924: synonym of Pelicaria vermis (Martyn, 1784)
 † Struthiolaria convexa Marwick, 1924: synonym of Pelicaria vermis (Martyn, 1784)
 Struthiolaria crenulata Lamarck, 1822: synonym of Pelicaria vermis (Martyn, 1784)
 † Struthiolaria fossa Marwick, 1924: synonym of Pelicaria vermis (Martyn, 1784)
 Struthiolaria gigas Sowerby II, 1842: synonym of Struthiolaria papulosa (Martyn, 1784)
 Struthiolaria inermis G.B. Sowerby I, 1821: synonym of Pelicaria vermis (Martyn, 1784)
 † Struthiolaria media Marwick, 1924: synonym of Pelicaria vermis (Martyn, 1784)
 Struthiolaria mirabilis E. A. Smith, 1875: synonym of Perissodonta mirabilis (E. A. Smith, 1875)
 Struthiolaria nodulosa Lamarck: synonym of Struthiolaria papulosa (Martyn, 1784)
 Struthiolaria scutulata (Gmelin, 1791): synonym of Tylospira scutulata (Gmelin, 1791)
 Struthiolaria tricarinata Lesson, 1841: synonym of Pelicaria vermis (Martyn, 1784)
 Struthiolaria vermis (Martyn, 1784): synonym of Pelicaria vermis (Martyn, 1784)
 Struthiolaria vermis bradleyi Neef, 1970: as above
 Struthiolaria vermis flemingi Neef, 1970: as above
 Struthiolaria vermis grahami Neef, 1970: as above
 Struthiolaria vermis powelli Neef, 1970: as above

References

 NZ Mollusca
 Ohio State University
http://www.stromboidea.de/?n=Species.Struthiolariidae
 Bruce A. Marshall, Molluscan and brachiopod taxa introduced by F. W. Hutton in The New Zealand journal of science; Journal of the Royal Society of New Zealand, Volume 25, Issue 4, 1995

 
Gastropods of New Zealand
Taxa named by Jean-Baptiste Lamarck
Gastropod genera